h is the debut self-titled album by Japanese producer DJ Honda. It was released on July 1, 1995 via Sony Records in Japan and on July 2, 1996 via Relativity Records worldwide. Audio production of the album was solely handled by DJ Honda, except for two tracks of its Japanese version co-produced with DJ Aladdin. It featured guest appearances from various hip hop artists, including Afrika Bambaataa, Biz Markie, Common, Def Jef, Donald D, Erick Sermon, Fat Joe, Gang Starr, Grand Puba, Kurtis Blow, Melle Mel, Prince Whipper Whip, Redman, Sadat X, Tha Alkaholiks and The Beatnuts among others.

The album peaked at number 90 on the US Billboard Top R&B/Hip-Hop Albums chart.

Track listing 

Notes
 Tracks 3, 4, 7, 9, 11 and 13 are exclusive to this Japanese release.

Sample credits
 Track 3 contains elements from "Coldblooded" by The Bar-Kays (1974)
 Track 4 contains elements from "People Make the World Go Round" by The Stylistics (1971)
 Track 5 contains elements from "Where Am I?" by Redman (1995)
 Track 6 contains elements from "Love Don't Wait" by The Bar-Kays (1985)
 Track 10 contains elements from "Marcella's Dream" by The Crusaders (1978) and "Hihache" by Lafayette Afro Rock Band (1973)
 Track 11 contains elements from "Slipping Into Darkness" by The Ramsey Lewis Trio (1972) and "How Many MC's..." by Black Moon (1993)

Personnel 

 Katsuhiro Hōnda – main artist, producer, scratches 
 Alphonso Henderson – co-producer ("Cold Blooded" and "Earth Till It's Down") 
 Peter Kang – executive producer 
 Taka Ozeki – executive producer 
 Christopher Edward Martin – scratches ("What Did You Expected") 
 Berntony Smalls – performer ("Out For The Cash (5 Deadly Venoms)", "The End" and "Out For The Cash") 
 C. Bullock – performer ("Kill The Noize" and "Out For The Cash") 
 Derrick Murphy – performer ("Straight Talk From NY")  
 Dino Hawkins – performer ("Bread+Jerry") 
 Donald Lamont – performer ("Old School Jam") 
 Eric Brooks – performer ("International Anthem") 
 Erick Sermon – performer ("Dame Of Death") 
 James Robinson – performer ("International Anthem") 
 James Whipper II – performer ("Old School Jam") 
 Jeffery S. Fortson – performer ("What It Look Like") 
 Jerry Tineo – performer ("Out For The Cash (5 Deadly Venoms)") 
 Joseph Antonio Cartagena – performer ("Out For The Cash (5 Deadly Venoms)" and "Out For The Cash") 
 Keith Edward Elam – performer ("What Did You Expected") 
 Kurtis Walker – performer ("Old School Jam") 
 Lance Taylor – performer ("Zulu Shout Out") 
 Lester Fernandez – performer ("Out For The Cash (5 Deadly Venoms)") 
 Lonnie Rashid Lynn Jr. – performer ("Out For The Cash (5 Deadly Venoms)" and "Interlude") 
 Marcel Theo Hall – performer ("Freestyle '95/Biz Freestyle") 
 Maxwell Dixon – performer ("Straight Talk From NY") 
 Melvin Glover – performer ("Cold Blooded") 
 Naybahood Watch – performer ("Earth Till It's Down") 
 Reggie Noble – performer ("Dat's My Word") 
 Rico Smith – performer ("International Anthem") 
 Sean Black – performer ("Fuk Dat")  
 Wakeem – performer ("Straight Talk From NY") 
 Michael Sarsfield – mastering 
 John Lawrence Byas – mixing (tracks: 1, 3, 5, 6, 12, 13 on 1995 version), engineering (tracks: 3, 5, 10 on 1996 version) 
 Fred "40 To The Head" Frederickson – mixing (tracks: 7, 8, 11 on 1995 version), engineering (track 12 on 1996 version) 
 Troy Staton – mixing (track 4 on 1995 version) 
 Liz Mercado – engineering (tracks: 4, 7, 8, 9, 11, 13 on 1996 version) 
 Dino Zervos – engineering (track 6 on 1996 version) 
 Patrick Aquintey – design

Charts

Release history

References

External links 

DJ Honda albums
1995 debut albums
Relativity Records albums
Sony Music Entertainment Japan albums
Albums produced by DJ Honda
Albums produced by DJ Aladdin